Ride Satan Ride is the debut album by the American stoner doom metal band Serpent Throne.

Track listing
  "Ride Satan Ride"   – 6:14
  "Wheels of Satan"   – 4:20
  "Veil of the Black Witch"   – 4:22
  "Cruicifer"   – 3:12
  "Blood Rites"   – 5:12
  "Chrome Wolf"   – 3:19
  "Back Stabbeth"   – 4:50
  "Satan Will Guide Us"   – 4:30
  "L.S.D. (Lawless Soldiers of the Devil)"   – 4:11

References 

2007 debut albums
Serpent Throne albums